These are the Saudi Arabia national football team all-time results:

Saudi Arabia national football team head to head

Last match updated was against  on 25 March 2019. 

Notes:
 (†) Defunct national teams

Results by period

1957–79

1980–99

2000–09

2010–19

Notes

References

 
Results